Reginald Leck (29 January 1890 – date of death unknown) was an English professional footballer who played as an inside-left. He made appearances in the English Football League for Wrexham, notably scoring the only goal in Wrexham's first ever Football League victory in a 0-1 away win over Hartlepool United.

He spent the majority of his career at Tranmere Rovers, where he was described by The Liverpool Echo as a "popular player".

References

1890 births
Date of death unknown
English footballers
Association football forwards
English Football League players
Tranmere Rovers F.C. players
Wrexham A.F.C. players